Malesherbes is a railway station serving Malesherbes, Loiret, Centre-Val de Loire in central France. It is one of the termini for the RER D trains. It is the southern most RER station in the Île-de-France network.

External links

 

Railway stations in Loiret
Railway stations in France opened in 1867